Ajax GO Station is a train and bus station in the GO Transit network  located in Ajax, Ontario, Canada. It is a stop on the Lakeshore East line and on the Oshawa/Finch Express bus route. The train platforms lie along the south side of Highway 401 with access to the station from Westney Road at Fairall Street.

A multi-level parking structure opened in 2013.

Connecting bus service
The station is the Ajax hub for Durham Region Transit (DRT), with most routes timed to connect with GO Train services. DRT's West Operational Facility, originally built for Ajax Transit, is on the south side of the station.

Durham Region Transit routes

 216 Harwood North

224 Harwood
915 Taunton
917 Bayly-Consumers 
GO Transit routes
 90 - Oshawa/Union Station Bus Terminal early morning bus
 96 - Oshawa/Finch Express Bus

References

External links

Ajax GO Station construction at GO Transit

GO Transit railway stations
Railway stations in the Regional Municipality of Durham
Rail transport in Ajax, Ontario
Railway stations in Canada opened in 1988
1988 establishments in Ontario